Malik Abad is a small town with a population of 2000 people in Tehsil Tump, Kech District, Balochistan, Pakistan. The founder of the town was Malik Bahdhur, and the town was named after him.

Populated places in Kech District
Villages in Pakistan